Packanack Lake is an unincorporated lake community in Wayne in Passaic County, New Jersey, United States. The community is located 30 minutes northwest of Manhattan.

The median income in Packanack Lake was $100,887, and the average income of households with children was $140,869. 95.9% of Packanack area residents are high school graduates while 57.5% are college graduates. 77.4% of residents are married. 41.4% of residents had children. The average age of residents was 40.6 years old.

Gatherings and social events are held on both East Beach (on Lake Drive East) and West Beach (on Lake Drive West) which include band concerts, craft shows, and bonfires.

Demographics

Overview 
Packanack's neighborhoods include; Packanack Estates, Packanack Lake, Packanack Manor, Packanack Ridge, and Packanack Woods.  Members of the Packanack Lake Community Association, also known as Packanack Lake Country Club, can use the tennis club and golf club located on Osborne Terrace. Packanack residents can send their grammar school-aged children to the Packanack School, located at 190 Oakwood Drive, and residents can also send their high school aged children to Wayne Valley High School or the many private schools in and around the township of Wayne. There are summer camps and activities for the children who live in the lake which include golf lessons, sailing lessons and competitively swimming on the Lake's swim team, The Packanack Pirates. The Packanack Lake Association collects dues from Packanack Lake residents for the purpose of funding the upkeep and use of lake activities.

Transportation to business/commercial centers throughout North Jersey is via Route 3, 4, 20, 21, 23, U.S. Route 46, Interstate 80, Interstate 287 and the Garden State Parkway. Train Stations and "Park and Ride's" provide access to North Jersey suburbs and New York City.

Nearby country clubs include the Preakness Hills Country Club located on Ratzer Road and the North Jersey Country Club located on Hamburg Turnpike.

Shopping and dining 
There is a dry cleaner, a post office, a flower and gift boutique, an event planner, a personal fitness center, Gencarelli's Pizza as well as the Lakeside Restaurant Bar which all are located on the lake next to the Packanack Lake Clubhouse. The clubhouse can be used for a variety of things from wedding rehearsals, to birthday parties and block parties. The clubhouse overlooks Packanack Lake with its wooden deck extension. Packanack Lake has its very own golf course, tennis club, elementary school, church and firehouse. Athletic fields are offered for community sports such as tennis, baseball, soccer and flag football. The lake itself is also considered a very productive luxury for residents in the area, as fishing and boating are offered exclusively to members of the Packanack community.

History 
The Packanack community began long ago when Native Americans farmed, fished and hunted in the area.  One tribe, the Pacquanacs, are still remembered in the very name Packanack which is said to mean appropriately "land made clear for cultivation".

In 1780, it was farming country and marshlands not far from the Continental Army encampment of French and American soldiers.  Close by were the headquarters of General George Washington at the Dey Mansion and Major-General Marquis de Lafayette at the Van Saun House. They still can be seen today.

Geology 
The Packanack area sits on two ridges running in roughly a north-south direction separated by a valley of marshland that in 1928 would be cleared of trees and brush; blocked at the south with an earth and clay dam to form Packanack Lake. That was when Joseph T. Castles, who had purchased 26 farms covering approximately 700 acres (2.8 km) of these ridges and valley in 1925, began laying the groundwork for the development of a community. The lake itself is man-made. Roads were built, water and sewer mains were laid and a sewage disposal system constructed. The real estate firm of Packanack Lake, Inc. was formed and work began on the clubhouse as well as 17 log cabins and small Cape Cod homes. The clubhouse, which was renovated in 2005, is located on the west beach along with a post office, restaurant/pub, florist, and a deli.

Gallery

References

External links 
 Township of Wayne
  Wayne schools

Wayne, New Jersey
Unincorporated communities in Passaic County, New Jersey
Unincorporated communities in New Jersey